Chrysosporide is a cyclic pentapeptide. It is isolated from the mycoparasitic fungus Sepedonium chrysospermum, found in New Zealand.

References

Cyclic peptides
Pentapeptides